Tsvetan Iliev (born 29 April 1990) is a Bulgarian football player, currently playing as a midfielder for Chernomorets Balchik.

Career
On 1 April 2012, Tsvetan Iliev scored a historic goal to help Svetkavitsa to a 1–0 win over Kaliakra Kavarna – this was the first occasion on which the team from Targovishte managed to defeat an opponent an A PFG match.

References

Living people
1990 births
Bulgarian footballers
Association football midfielders
PFC Svetkavitsa players
Neftochimic Burgas players
FC Chernomorets Balchik players
PFC Dobrudzha Dobrich players
PFC Spartak Varna players
First Professional Football League (Bulgaria) players
Second Professional Football League (Bulgaria) players